WDSL can refer to:

 Wireless Digital subscriber line
 WDSL (AM), an AM radio station located in Mocksville, North Carolina

Not to be confused with WSDL (Web Services Description Language).